Events from the year 1231 in Ireland.

Incumbent
Lord: Henry III

Events

Births

Deaths
 Dúinnín Ó Maolconaire, historian, poet and Ollamh Síl Muireadaigh

References

 
1230s in Ireland
Ireland
Years of the 13th century in Ireland